The Bosnia and Herzegovina FA Training Centre is the training ground of the Football Association of Bosnia and Herzegovina located in the Crkvičko brdo neighbourhood of Zenica, Zenica-Doboj Canton, Bosnia and Herzegovina.  The centre was officially inaugurated on 2 September 2013 by then-president of UEFA, Michel Platini, after the first stage of construction was completed.

History
The Football Association of Bosnia and Herzegovina, aware of the fact that it did not own training facilities for its national team selections, drafted out plans for the construction of a modern training centre in the mid-2000s, quickly securing funds for the project and deciding on the location. A suburb of Zenica was chosen because the town's Bilino Polje Stadium was the national team's home ground at the time. The implementation of the project coincided with large-scale, politically motivated turbulences in the organization that eventually led to a FIFA-issued short-term suspension on all competitive national team selections. The instability in the governing body of Bosnian football led to the shelving of the project, for it to reemerge only after an UEFA-sponsored Normalization Committee was formed, which included the likes of Ivica Osim, Dušan Bajević, Faruk Hadžibegić, Darko Ljubojević and Sead Kajtaz. The Committee, being assigned full executive power as a means for solving the aforementioned issues in the FA, immediately sped up the training centre project, with construction beginning in early 2011. Construction was completed in late 2013, with the centre being officially inaugurated by Michel Platini on 2 September 2013. On 21 September 2015, after a two-year expansion project, new facilities, including an indoor arena were opened.

Facilities
The training centre consists of one artificial and two natural turf pitches, an indoor Futsal arena, terraces, a 27-room hotel, wellness centre, restaurant, indoor and outdoor cafés, two large conference rooms, a recreational lobby and designated administration and technical premises.    Furthermore, it is encompassed by a large private parking lot, entrance gates and a main square. On 23 October 2015 the centre was granted UEFA and FIFA PRO licences, and has subsequently hosted women's and youth qualifiers.

References

External links

  
 The Football Association of Bosnia and Herzegovina 
Bosnia and Herzegovina at FIFA 
Bosnia and Herzegovina at UEFA

Bosnia and Herzegovina national football team
Bosnia and Herzegovina
Football venues in Bosnia and Herzegovina
Buildings and structures in Zenica
Football in Bosnia and Herzegovina
National football academies